Niccolò Squizzato (born 7 January 2002) is an Italian professional footballer who plays as a midfielder for  club Renate on loan from Inter Milan.

Club career
On 24 August 2021, Squizzato was loaned to Serie C club Juve Stabia.

On 19 July 2022, Squizzato joined Renate on loan.

Career statistics

Club

References

External links

2002 births
Living people
Italian footballers
Association football midfielders
Serie C players
Inter Milan players
S.S. Juve Stabia players
A.C. Renate players
Italy youth international footballers